Christensenia is a genus of ferns in the botanical family Marattiaceae. The genus is confined to the Indo-Malayan region. The basal chromosome number for this genus is 2n=80.

Christensenia is unique in the Marattiaceae, because of its reticulate venation, palmately arranged leaves and radial synangia. Christensenia produces enormous amounts of spores, up to 7,000 spores per sporangium.
The presence of a radial synangium is an archaic character, very similar to some of the fossil Asterothecaceae/Psaroniaceae, such as Scolecopteris. Christensenia itself has no fossil record.

Species
After the 1993 revision by Rolleri, only two species and one variety are recognized:
 Christensenia aesculifolia (Blume) Maxon (type species)
 Christensenia aesculifolia var. korthalsii
 Christensenia lobbiana (de Vriese) Rolleri

References
 BRUMMITT, R. K. (1992) Vascular plant families and genera. Royal Botanic Gardens
 
 Rolleri, C. H. 1993. Revision of the genus Christensenia. Amer. Fern J. 83(1): 3–19.

Marattiidae
Fern genera